AHMS as an abbreviation or initialism may stand for:
 A Hundred Million Suns
 Austrian Holocaust Memorial Service
 American Home Missionary Society
 AHMS college of distance education